Teufelsloch may refer to:

 Teufelsloch (Teufelsbäder), a sinkhole with a karst spring in the Harz Mountains of Germany near Osterode am Harz, Lower Saxony
 Teufelsloch (doline), a doline in the southern Black Forest in Germany near Rheinfelden, Baden-Württemberg.
  Teufelsloch (ravine), a ravine in the Swabian Jura near Bad Boll, Baden-Württemberg
 Teufelsloch (Lattengebirge), the natural rock arch in the Lattengebirge near Berchtesgaden, Bavaria
 The Teufelshöhle (Pottenstein), near Pottenstein, Bavaria, Germany
 The Teufelshöhle (Steinau), near Steinau, Hesse, Germany
 Průrva Ploučnice, the artificial, underground river course in Bohemia, Czech Republic
 Devil's Hole, the underground water reservoir in Nevada, USA